The Das Balsas River is a river in Maranhao, Brazil.

See also
List of rivers of Maranhão

References
Brazilian Ministry of Transport

Rivers of Maranhão